The Duma of Astrakhan Oblast, formerly the State Duma of Astrakhan Oblast (2001–2010), is the regional parliament of Astrakhan Oblast, a federal subject of Russia. A total of 44 deputies are elected for five-year terms.

Elections

2016

2021

Notes

References 

Politics of Astrakhan Oblast
Astrakhan Oblast